The Girl Who Came Back is a 1918 American silent drama film directed by Robert G. Vignola and written by Beulah Marie Dix based upon the play by C. M. S. McLellan. The film stars Ethel Clayton, Elliott Dexter, Theodore Roberts, James Neill, Charles West, and Marcia Manon. The film was released on September 8, 1918, by Paramount Pictures.

Plot
As described in a film magazine, Lois Hartner (Clayton), daughter of the thief Michael "Old Hartner" (Roberts), is saved from death in a shipwreck by George Bayard (Dexter), a state senator and social reformer. Her father plans to rob the Bayard house of a valuable string of pearls. Lois is charged with the duty of obtaining the pearls, but during the operation George surprises her. Ralph Burton (West), scapegrace brother-in-law of George, takes the pearls while George is absent from the room, and George believes Lois has taken them. She has determined to give up the criminal life she was living and goes to the West. After Ralph confesses to the theft, George finds her and makes her his wife.

Cast
Ethel Clayton as Lois Hartner
Elliott Dexter as State Sen. George Bayard
Theodore Roberts as Michael Hartner
James Neill as Gov. Burton
Charles West as Ralph Burton
Marcia Manon as Dorothy Burton
Jack Brammall as Doyle
Jane Wolfe as Mrs. Walters 
John McKinnon as Bayard's Butler
Pansy Perry as Burton's Maid

Reception
Like many American films of the time, The Girl Who Came Back was subject to restrictions and cuts by city and state film censorship boards. For example, the Chicago Board of Censors required a cut, in Reel 2, of two scenes of young woman turning combination of safe where light plays on her hands.

Preservation status
The Girl Who Came Back is preserved in the Filmmuseum Nederland or EYE Institut, Netherlands.

References

External links

Film stills at silenthollywood.com

1918 films
1910s English-language films
Silent American drama films
1918 drama films
Paramount Pictures films
Films directed by Robert G. Vignola
American black-and-white films
American silent feature films
1910s American films